Elections to Liverpool City Council were held on Thursday 12 May 1955. After the election, the composition of the council was:

Election result

Ward results

* - Councillor seeking re-election

(PARTY) - Party of former Councillor

The Councillors seeking re-election at this election were elected in the 'all-up' election in 1953 for a two-year term (as they were the candidates receiving the second highest number of votes). Therefore, comparisons are made with the 1953 election results.

Abercromby

Aigburth

Allerton

Anfield

Arundel

Breckfield

Broadgreen

Central

Childwall

Church

Clubmoor

County

Croxteth

Dingle

Dovecot

Everton

Fairfield

Fazakerley

Gillmoss

Granby

Kensington

Low Hill

Melrose

Netherfield

Old Swan

Picton

Pirrie

Prince's Park

Sandhills

St. Domingo

St. James

St. Mary's

St. Michael's

Smithdown

Speke

Tuebrook

Vauxhall

Warbreck

Westminster

Woolton

Aldermanic elections
At the meeting of the City Council on 23 May 1955 the terms of office of twenty of the forty Aldermen expired and the Councillors elected twenty Aldermen to fill the vacant positions for a term of six years. Fifteen Conservative, one Independent, and two Liberal Aldermen were replaced by eighteen Labour Aldermen, allowing Labour to take control of the council for the first time.

By-elections

Low Hill

By-election caused by the election of John Mathew Taylor (elected Cllr. for Low Hill in 1954) as Alderman.

Abercromby

By-election caused by the election of Harry Livermore (elected Cllr. for Abercromby in 1953) as Alderman.

Central

By-election caused by the election of Bessie Braddock as Alderman.

Granby

By-election caused by the election of Elizabeth Trainor (elected as Cllr. for Granby in 1953) as Alderman.

St. James

By-election caused by the election of Hugh Carr (elected as Cllr. for St. James in 1953) and William George Ingham (elected as Cllr. for St. James in 1954) as Aldermen.

Speke

By-election caused by the election of Alexander Hardman (elected as Cllr. for Speke in 1953) as Alderman.

Pritchard had contested Kirkdale as a Liberal in the 1950 General Election

Westminster

By-election caused by the election of John Hamilton (elected as Cllr. for Westminster in 1953) as Alderman.

Everton

By-election caused by the election of  John Leslie Hughes (elected as Cllr. for Everton in 1953) and David Nickson (elected as Cllr. for Everton in 1954) as Aldermen.

Sandhills

By-election caused by the election of Peter McKernan (elected as Cllr. for Sandhills in 1953), Henry Aldritt (elected as Cllr. for Sandhills in 1954) and Stanley Part (elected as Cllr. for Sandhills in 1955) as Aldermen.

Vauxhall

By-election caused by the election of  Joseph Cyril Brady (elected as Cllr. for Vauxhall in 1954) as Alderman.

Dingle

By-election caused by the election of Frank Hampton Cain (elected as Cllr. for Dingle in 1955) as Alderman.

Pirrie

By-election caused by the election of  Joseph Morgan (elected as Cllr. for Pirrie in 1955) as Alderman.

Picton

By-election caused by the election of Charles James Minton (elected as Cllr. for Picton in 1953) as Alderman.

Dovecot

By-election caused by the election of Abraham Louis Caplan  (elected as Cllr. for Dovecot in 1954) as Alderman.

Church by-election 27 October 1955

Alderman Mabel Fletcher M.A. Died on 2 December 1955.

Cllr. Peter James O'Hare was elected by the Councillors as an Alderman on 4 January 1956 and assigned as the Returning Officer for the County ward.

References

1955
1955 English local elections
May 1955 events in the United Kingdom
1950s in Liverpool